Ran Serey Leakhena (born 1 October 1979)  is an appointed government official for coordinating the international cooperation to fight against human trafficking in Cambodia.

References

1979 births
Cambodian People's Party politicians
Living people
20th-century Cambodian women
21st-century Cambodian women politicians
21st-century Cambodian politicians